David Hull (born August 5, 1985) is an American actor and singer, best known for playing White Josh in The CW comedy-drama series Crazy Ex-Girlfriend. Prior to his television and movie work, he performed in several stage plays and Broadway musicals.

Early life
Hull was born and raised in Ohio just outside of Cincinnati. When he was younger he was interested in politics and was a member of the Junior Statesmen of America. At the age of sixteen, he discovered his love of music when he performed pop and country revues at local theme park Kings Island. He later attended the University of Michigan.

Career
Hull had a number of Broadway credits before being cast in recurring role as White Josh on Crazy Ex-Girlfriend in 2015. In April 2017, it was announced that Hull had been promoted to series regular. He also had a recurring role as Travis Moore in the HBO comedy series Insecure. He played Logan on The Middle.

Hull appeared in the 2017 film The Dark Tapes. He also appeared in the 2018 film Benjamin directed by Bob Saget.

In 2022, Hull was announced as part of the cast of a film adaptation of several Chekhov plays to be directed by Martin McDonagh. The film will take elements of several of Chekhov's famous works, including The Cherry Orchard.

Filmography

Film

Television

Stage

References

External links
 

Living people
American male television actors
1985 births
University of Michigan alumni
Actors from Ohio
Singers from Ohio